Yaak Karsunke (born 4 June 1934, Berlin) is a German author and actor.

The son of an engineer and the procurer of a publishing house, he grew up in the borough of Pankow. In 1949 his family moved to Friedenau where he passed the Abitur in 1953 and studied jurisprudence for three semesters. From 1955 to 1957 he studied drama at the Max-Reinhardt-Schule, today known as the Ernst Busch Academy of Dramatic Arts.

Along with other leftist authors, he founded the literary review , for which he served as editor in chief from 1965 until August 1968, when he resigned as a protest against the Soviet repression of the Prague Spring. 

In the early 1970s, Karsunke befriended Rainer Werner Fassbinder, appearing in his films Love Is Colder Than Death (1969), Gods of the Plague (1970), and Berlin Alexanderplatz (1980). From 1976 to 1979 he served as Fassbinder's technical adviser at the German Film and Television Academy Berlin. From 1981 to 1999 he taught creative writing at the Berlin University of the Arts.

Karsunke has also worked extensively as a lyricist. Since the late-1960s he has written many plays and radio dramas.

Works
 , Berlin 1967
 , Berlin 1969
 , Weinheim [u.a.] 1970 (with Dietlind Blech)
 , Munich 1972 (with Riki Hachfeld)
 ,  1973 (with Peter Janssens)
 , Berlin 1973
 ,  1975 (with Peter Janssens)
 , Berlin 1979
 ,  1979 (with Wilhelm Dieter Siebert)
 , Berlin 1982
 ,  1982
 , Berlin 1984 (with Arwed D. Gorella)
 ,  1986
 , Berlin 1989
 , Berlin 1992
 , Munich 2004

In translation
 Arnold Wesker: ,  1970 (with Ingrid Karsunke)

References

External links
 

1934 births
Living people
German male film actors
German lyricists
Writers from Berlin
Male actors from Berlin
20th-century German male actors
Ernst Busch Academy of Dramatic Arts alumni
Academic staff of the Berlin University of the Arts
20th-century German dramatists and playwrights
German male dramatists and playwrights
German-language poets
20th-century German male writers